Laghlan McWhannell (born 29 October 1998 in New Zealand) is a New Zealand rugby union player who plays for the  in Super Rugby. His playing position is lock. He has signed for the Chiefs squad in 2019.

Reference list

External links
itsrugby.co.uk profile

1998 births
New Zealand rugby union players
Living people
Rugby union locks
Waikato rugby union players
Chiefs (rugby union) players
Rugby union players from Waikato